The Pinjarra to Narrogin railway was a 153 kilometre cross-country railway line built between the towns of Pinjarra and Narrogin in Western Australia.

The line was opened in stages between 1910 and 1927 (with construction being delayed by the onset of the First World War) to service the booming timber industry as well as rural and fruit-growing establishments between the two termini. Pinjarra and Narrogin are located on the Western Australian Government Railways' South Western and Great Southern main lines respectively, and as such the Pinjarra to Narrogin railway provided an important link between the two, providing a rail transport link to towns and mills along the way, such as Dwellingup and Boddington, both of which continue to be significant settlements in the region.

The closing of many of the local timber mills led to a gradual decline in traffic on the line and, accordingly, commercial services were withdrawn progressively until cessation of the last remaining service in 1984. However, the Hotham Valley Railway has operated a heritage railway over a thirty-two kilometre section of the line as far as Etmilyn from 1974 onwards and continues to do so.

References

 
 

Railway lines in Western Australia
Railway lines opened in 1910